The men's 1000 m speed skating competition for the 2002 Winter Olympics was held in Salt Lake City, Utah, United States. Gerard van Velde, who had finished 4th in the Olympics twice already, delivered a surprise by skating a world record and winning the gold medal.

Records

Prior to this competition, the existing world and Olympic records were as follows.

The following new world and Olympic records were set during this competition.

Results

References

Men's speed skating at the 2002 Winter Olympics